Bolgar (Bolğar) is a town and the administrative center of Spassky District in the Republic of Tatarstan, Russia, located on the left bank of the Volga River,  from Kazan. As of the 2010 Census, its population was 8,650.

It was previously known as Spassk (until 1926), Spassk-Tatarsky (until 1935), Kuybyshev (until 1991).

History

The excavated monuments of Bolghar, the medieval capital of Volga Bulgaria, are within easy reach from the town. The modern town of Spassk was formed from the village of Spassk (Chertykovo) on the bank of Bezdna River in 1781. It was renamed Spassk-Tatarsky in 1926, then Kuybyshev ), in honor of Valerian Kuybyshev, in 1935, before getting its present name in 1991. It served as a district administrative center since 1930.

In 1957, due to the construction of Kuybyshev Reservoir and flooding of the original Spassk, the town was moved from the place of its foundation closer to historical Bolgar.

In 1991, the town changed its name to Bolgar in honor of the remains of the medieval city of Bolghar (Bolgar Historical and Archaeological Complex) located nearby.

Since 2010, on the initiative and the supervision of the first president of the Republic of Tatarstan Mintimer Shaimiev, the complex programme 'Cultural Heritage - Island-Town of Sviyazhsk and Ancient Bolgar' has been implemented in Bolgar. The programme involves the conservation of architectural and archaeological heritage of Bolgar and the development of its touristic infrastructure. The programme has the following results:

 Key architectural monuments as Small Minaret, Cathedral Mosque, Khan's Shrine, Eastern Mausoleum, Northern Mausoleum, Eastern Chamber, Assumption Church were conserved;
 Key archaeological ruins as Khan's Palace, Bath No2, Pottery Kilns were conserved; 
 Tourism and research infrastructure, including a River Station with the Museum of Bulgarian Civilization, Memorial Sign in honor of the adoption of Islam in the Volga Bulgaria, White Mosque, Healer's House and Crafts Workshops, International Centre for Archaeological Research, International Archaeological School, Museum of Bread, were constructed;
 New museum expositions, including an Open-Air Museum on Turkic-Tatar Writing and Medieval Crafts of the City of Bolgar Ground were created; 
 Several houses on Nazarovykh and Mukhamedyara Streets were conserved, which are currently re-used as a cafe and museums;
 Volga Riverside from the River station to the Saint Abraham's  Well was improved and enhanced with interactive education facilities on Bolgar heritage.

Administrative and municipal status
Within the framework of administrative divisions, Bolgar serves as the administrative center of Spassky District, to which it is directly subordinated. As a municipal division, the town of Bolgar, together with the selo of Bolgary, is incorporated within Spassky Municipal District as Bolgar Urban Settlement.

Economy
As of 1997, the town's industrial enterprises included a meat factory, a bakery, a brewery, a clothing factory, and a forestry farm.

Since 2010, the tourism flow to Bolgar has increased about 20 times: in 2010 Bolgar was visited by 50 000 tourists, in 2018 the annual visitation number has reached 541 000. In 2016, Bolgar became the most popular touristic towns of Russia.

Demographics

As of 1989, the population was ethnically mostly Russian (83.4%), Tatar (12.9%), and Chuvash (2.1%).

As of 2018, the town is on the 989 place from 1113 cities and towns of the Russian Federation in terms of the number of its inhabitants.

Attractions 
The town is bordering the Bolgar Historical and Archaeological Complex World Heritage site. The property was inscribed to the World Heritage List in 2014 in accordance with criteria (ii) and (vi). Its architectural and archaeological heritage is considered evidence of the medieval city of Bolgar, which existed in the 7-15th centuries as a key political centre of the Volga Bulgaria and the first capital of the Golden Horde. The property also has a significant religious value as a symbolic place of the adoption of Islam by the Volga Bulgaria in 922 and serves as a pilgrimage place for Tatar Muslims. The following historic monuments are located in the complex:

 Northern Mausoluem
 Eastern Mausoleum
 Cathedral Mosque
 Big Minaret (Reconstruction)
 Assumption Church (currently operates as the Museum of the History of the Assumption Church)
 Small Minaret and Khan's Shrine
 Khan's Palace
 Black Chamber
 Eastern Chamber
 White Chamber
 Bath House No 2
 Bath House No 3
 Red Chamber

The Bolgar Historical and Archaeological Complex is managed by the Bolgar State Historical and Architectural Museum-Reserve, which museums are located inside of the property:

 Museum of the Bulgarian Civilization
 Quran Museum (Memorial Sign in honor of adoption of Islam by the Volga Bulgaria)
 Healer's House Museum
 Museum of the History of the Assumption Church
 Turkic-Tatar Writing Open Air Museum
 Bolgar Tea Party Museum
 Town on a River Museum
 Museum of the Nobility of Spassky Uyezd
 Abdulla Alish Museum
 Interactive Historic Riverside
 Saint Abraham's Well

There are several attractions located close to the Bolgar Historical and Archaeological Complex:

 Museum of Bread
 Small Town
 Camel Farm

References

Notes

Sources

External links
Official website of Bolgar 
Bolgar Business Directory 

Cities and towns in Tatarstan
Populated places on the Volga
Spassky Uyezd (Kazan Governorate)
Populated places established in 1781